Dmytro Solovey (born 28 September 1993) is a visually impaired Ukrainian Paralympic judoka. He represented Ukraine at the Summer Paralympics in 2012, 2016 and 2021. He won two medals: the gold medal in the men's 73 kg event in 2012 and the silver medal in the men's 73 kg event in 2016.

In 2015 he won the silver medal in the men's 73 kg event at the 2015 IBSA European Judo Championships.

References

External links 
 

1993 births
Living people
Ukrainian male judoka
Paralympic judoka of Ukraine
Paralympic gold medalists for Ukraine
Paralympic silver medalists for Ukraine
Paralympic medalists in judo
Judoka at the 2012 Summer Paralympics
Judoka at the 2016 Summer Paralympics
Judoka at the 2020 Summer Paralympics
Medalists at the 2012 Summer Paralympics
Medalists at the 2016 Summer Paralympics
Place of birth missing (living people)
20th-century Ukrainian people
21st-century Ukrainian people